John Richard Green (12 December 1837 – 7 March 1883) was an English historian.

Early life 
Green was born on 12 December 1837, the son of a tradesman in Oxford, where he was educated, first at Magdalen College School, and then at Jesus College, Oxford, where he is commemorated by the J. R. Green Society, which meets several times a term and is run by students from the undergraduate body. He grew up in a high-church Tory family from which he rebelled as early as 1850, being "temporarily banished from his uncle's house for ridiculing the uproar over 'Papal Aggression.'"

Career

Ecclesiastical career 
He entered the church, being ordained to the diaconate in 1860, and served various cures in London, under a constant strain caused by delicate health. Always an enthusiastic student of history, the little leisure time he had was devoted to research.

Turn to historical writings 
In 1869 he finally gave up his work as a clergyman, and was appointed librarian at Lambeth. He had been laying plans for various historical works, including a History of the English Church as exhibited in a series of Lives of the Archbishops of Canterbury, and, what he proposed as his magnum opus, a history of England under the Angevin kings. After suffering from failing health he abandoned these projects and instead concentrated his energies on the preparation of his A Short History of the English People, which appeared in 1874, and at once gave him an assured place in the first rank of historical writers.

Abandoning his proposed history of the Angevins, he confined himself to expanding his Short History into A History of the English People in four volumes (1878–1880) and writing The Making of England, of which one volume only, coming down to 828, had appeared when he died at Mentone in March 1883. After his death appeared The Conquest of England. The Short History, which in 1915 was republished as part of the Everyman Library, may be said to have begun a new epoch in the writing of history, making the social, industrial, and moral progress of the people its main theme. It sold 235,000 copies in England alone.

More recently J. W. Burrow proposed that Green, like William Stubbs and Edward Augustus Freeman, was a historical scholar with little or no experience of public affairs, with views of the present that were Romantically historicised, and who was drawn to history by what was in a broad sense an antiquarian passion for the past, as well as a patriotic and populist impulse to identify the nation and its institutions as the collective subject of English history, making

Personal life 
In 1877 he married Alice Stopford.

During the 1870s Green suffered from lung problems. His wife assisted him in carrying out and completing his work as his broken health took its toll during his few remaining years. He died on 7 March 1883.

Sir Leslie Stephen edited a volume of Green's correspondence, which was published in 1901 (see "Works by and About John Richard Green" under "External Links," below).

Works 
(1874) A Short History of the English People
(1879) English Literature (Editor)
(1879) Readings From English History (Editor)
(1880) A History of the English People
(1881) The Making of England
(1883) The Conquest of England
(1884) The Conquest of England

References

Footnotes

Bibliography

 
  This article incorporates text from this public-domain publication.

Further reading

External links

 
 
 

1837 births
1883 deaths
Alumni of Jesus College, Oxford
19th-century Anglican deacons
19th-century Church of England clergy
19th-century English historians
English librarians
People from Oxford
People educated at Magdalen College School, Oxford
English male non-fiction writers
19th-century English male writers